The Arcachon Cup is a defunct WTA Tour affiliated tennis tournament played in 1989. It was held in Arcachon in France and played on outdoor clay courts.

Finals

Singles

Doubles

References
 WTA Results Archive

 
Clay court tennis tournaments
Defunct tennis tournaments in France
WTA Tour